Asem is a town in Kumasi in the Ashanti Region of Ghana.

Town structure
The town in under the jurisdiction of the Kumasi Metropolitan Assembly and is in the Subin constituency of the Ghana parliament.

References

Populated places in Kumasi Metropolitan Assembly